Roset-Fluans is a commune in the Doubs department in the Bourgogne-Franche-Comté region in eastern France.

Geography
The Osselle cave is one of the oldest known caves in Franche-Comté. It was a refuge for priests during the French Revolution.

History
The commune was formed by merging four communes: Roset, Fluans, La Corne-de-Chaux, and Château-le-Bois. It also includes two villages: La Froidière and La Veloupe.

Château-le-Bois had 132 inhabitants in 1803, but is now completely covered by forest.

Population

See also
 Communes of the Doubs department

References

External links

 Roset-Fluans on the regional Web site 

Communes of Doubs